The Women's shot put at the 2014 Commonwealth Games, as part of the athletics programme, was held at Hampden Park on 30 July 2014.

Final

References

Women's shot put
2014
2014 in women's athletics